Lightmoor Platform railway station was a station to the east of Coalbrookdale, Shropshire, England. The station was opened in 1907 and closed in 1962. The station was situated on the Madeley Junction to Buildwas Line to the west of Lightmoor Junction.

References

Further reading

Disused railway stations in Shropshire
Railway stations in Great Britain opened in 1907
Railway stations in Great Britain closed in 1917
Railway stations in Great Britain opened in 1919
Railway stations in Great Britain closed in 1962
Former Great Western Railway stations